Kirnon is a surname. Notable people with the surname include: 

 Conrad Henry Kirnon (1927–1994), American jazz and R&B drummer 
 Sam Kirnon (born 1962), English cricketer
 Sarah Kirnon (born 1960s), West Indian chef